Bolibar is a 1928 British silent drama film directed by Walter Summers and starring Elissa Landi, Michael Hogan, and Carl Harbord. It was based on the 1920 novel The Marquis of Bolibar by Leo Perutz. It was made by British Instructional Films at Cricklewood Studios. Also outside scenes shot on the island of Malta with hundreds of Maltese extras.

Cast
 Elissa Landi as Françoise-Marie / La Monita 
 Michael Hogan as Lt. Donop 
 Hubert Carter as Col. Bellay 
 Carl Harbord as Lt. Gunther 
 Jerrold Robertshaw as The Marquise of Bolibar 
 Cecil Barry as Dapt. Egolstein 
 Evelyn Roberts as Captain Brockendorf 
 Gerald Pring as Captain O'Callaghan 
 Charles Emerald as Colonel 
 Hector Abbas as Artist

See also
The Marquis of Bolibar (1922)

References

Bibliography
 Low, Rachael. History of the British Film, 1918-1929. George Allen & Unwin, 1971.

External links

1928 films
1920s English-language films
Films directed by Walter Summers
British silent feature films
Films based on Austrian novels
Films shot at Cricklewood Studios
Napoleonic Wars films
Films set in Spain
British black-and-white films
Remakes of Austrian films
1920s historical drama films
British historical drama films
1928 drama films
Silent drama films
1920s British films